Grinda Ridge is a rock ridge  long, immediately north of Mount Grytoyr in the Mühlig-Hofmann Mountains of Queen Maud Land, Antarctica. It was mapped from surveys and air photos by the Sixth Norwegian Antarctic Expedition (1956–60) and named Grinda (the gate).

References

Ridges of Queen Maud Land
Princess Martha Coast